Assistant may refer to:
 Assistant (by Speaktoit), a virtual assistant app for smartphones
 Assistant (software), a software tool to assist in computer configuration
 Google Assistant, a virtual assistant by Google
 The Assistant (TV series), an MTV reality show
 ST Assistant, a British tugboat
 HMS Assistant, a Royal Navy vessel

See also
 Apprenticeship
 Assistant coach
 Assistant district attorney
 Assistant professor
 Certified nursing assistant
 Court of assistants
 Graduate assistant
 Office Assistant
 Personal assistant
 Personal digital assistant
 Production assistant
 Research assistant
 Teaching assistant
 Assistance (disambiguation)
 Assist (disambiguation)
 Aides (disambiguation)

Assistance